Craig Ian Veroni is a South African-born Canadian actor from Vancouver best known for his role as Dr. Peter Grodin on Stargate Atlantis.

Biography
He was born in Cape Town, South Africa. His family immigrated to Canada when Veroni was eight. Veroni first acted in school plays at Port Moody Secondary School, and later trained at Vancouver's Studio 58.

Veroni is most well known for his role as Peter Grodin on Stargate Atlantis. Grodin was a British scientist who was part of the expedition to Atlantis. He appeared in nine episodes in Season 1 before being killed off in the penultimate episode. He is also known for his role as Amir in the feature film Two For The Money, with Matthew McConaughey, Al Pacino and Rene Russo.

Veroni also had recurring roles on Da Vinci's Inquest and Dark Angel. He made guest appearances on several other shows filmed in the Vancouver area, such as Smallville, Jeremiah, Tru Calling, Blood Ties, Battlestar Galactica, and Psych.

He now works as a realtor in Vancouver, BC, where he resides.

References

External links

Real Estate Website
Craig Veroni - The Official Website
Facebook Business Page
Facebook Page
Twitter
Linkedin
Gateworld interview
Blood Ties interview

Living people
Canadian male television actors
Canadian male voice actors
South African emigrants to Canada
Male actors from Cape Town
Studio 58 people
1969 births